Karore is an Austronesian language spoken by about 550 individuals between the Andru and Johanna Rivers in West New Britain Province, Papua New Guinea on the island of New Britain.

References

Pasismanua languages
Languages of West New Britain Province
Vulnerable languages